The 2014 Gulf Ice Hockey Championship was the third Gulf Ice Hockey Championship. It took place between 6 and 12 June in Kuwait City, Kuwait. The United Arab Emirates won the tournament after defeating Kuwait in the final, claiming their third title. Qatar finished third place after defeating Oman in the third place game.

Round-robin
Four participating teams were placed in a single round-robin. After playing the round-robin, the number one ranked team is seeded into a semi-final against the fourth ranked team and the second ranked team plays in the second semi-final against the third ranked team.All times local. (UTC+03)

Playoff round
Bracket

Semi-finals

Third place

Final

Final standings

References

Gulf
Gulf Ice Hockey Championship
Gulf Ice Hockey Championship
International ice hockey competitions hosted by Kuwait
Gulf Ice Hockey Championship